The Jarmulowsky Bank Building is a 12-story building on the Lower East Side of Manhattan in New York City. Located at Canal Street and Orchard Street, the Jarmulowsky Bank Building was built in 1912 and designed by architects William Lawrence Rouse and Lafayette A. Goldstone in the Beaux-Arts style. The building is faced with limestone at its lower section and architectural terracotta on its higher section.

Sender Jarmulowsky established the Jarmulowsky Bank in 1873. When World War I broke out two years after the bank building was completed, there was a run on the bank, as German investors withdrew funds to send to relatives abroad, and the bank failed.
  
Until 1990, the building featured a massive tempietto rising 50 feet to a dome ringed by eagles. The building was renovated in 1990 by Sing May Realty and the tempietto destroyed. In 2014, a proposal to build a replica of this structure was approved by the New York City Landmarks Preservation Commission. This was completed and unveiled by the beginning of 2020.

The building is now used for commercial purposes.

In 2013 the building was slated for conversion into a boutique, luxury hotel.

See also
National Register of Historic Places listings in Manhattan below 14th Street
List of New York City Designated Landmarks in Manhattan below 14th Street

References

External links

Lower East Side
Commercial buildings in Manhattan
Bank buildings in Manhattan
Historic bank buildings in the United States
Commercial buildings completed in 1912
History of immigration to the United States
Culture of New York City
New York City Designated Landmarks in Manhattan
1912 establishments in New York City
Beaux-Arts architecture in New York City